Military polonaise may refer to:

 Polonaises Op. 40 (Chopin), "Military Polonaise" by Frédéric Chopin
 A Polish military division of World War I